Kids World is a 2001 children’s film written by Michael Lach and directed by Dale G. Bradley. Though the story is set in Oregon, the project was filmed in Auckland, New Zealand.  The film had limited release in the US in 2001, before its Australian release on Boxing Day, 2001, and New Zealand release in 2002.  In the United Kingdom, its DVD title was “Honey, the Kids Rule the World.”  In 2007 it had DVD release under that title by Third Millennium Distribution and in 2008 by Boulevard Entertainment.  It aired in 2007 in Romania on Kanal D television.

Plot
12-year-old Ryan Mitchell (Blake Foster) and his friends Stu (Anton Tennet) and Twinkie (Michael Purvis) are tired of being told what to do. They have to do their homework, eat their vegetables, wear a coat when they go outside, wear a helmet when they ride their skateboards, and aren’t allowed to come and go as they please like their older brothers and sisters. One day, Ryan and his pals find an ancient Native American burial ground, where they discover a magical wishing glass. Using the glass, Ryan wishes that all the grown-ups and teenagers in the world would disappear—and suddenly, his wish comes true! It’s party time for Ryan and all his friends until they discover there’s a problem——the moment anyone turns 13, they suddenly vanish!

Main cast

 Christopher Lloyd as Leo
 Blake Foster as Ryan Mitchell
 Anton Tennet as Stu
 Olivia Tennet as Nicole Mitchell
 Anna Wilson as Holly
 Michael Purvis   as Twinkie
 Todd Emerson as Detloff

Reception

Reception
“Variety” panned the film calling it “Charmless and exceptionally tasteless pre-teen time-filler” and “the sort of movie that seems conceived more out of tax-credit incentives than from any real desire to engage children’s imaginations.” The story is set in Oregon but shot in New Zealand, exemplified by the principal cast’s accents. The work of writer Michael Lach and director Dale G. Bradley was pointed out as a “slack setup, in which recycle decades-old cliches about why kids don’t get along with their parents.”   They found Christopher Lloyd’s presence as a mentally disabled man with the mind of a child inexplicable, in that it was a “thankless role, which requires little of him, except to sit on a porch, playing a didgeridoo (another good hint that we’re not really in Oregon) until, in a few moments of convenient lucidity, he helps to save the day.” 

Conversely, Australia’s “Urban Cinefile” gave a positive review, offering that it was “refreshing to see a film where kids behave like kids,” calling the film old fashioned, “in that it relies on its storyline and engaging performances by a terrific young cast.”  They felt the film was a colorful adventure for pre-teens and that it was “jam-packed with humor, action and enough twists and turns to keep us engaged. ”   The also felt the music score was both fast-paced and upbeat, and praised the entire cast, noting that Christopher Lloyd’s character was credible.

Awards and nominations

 2000, Won’ Best Juvenile Performer’ for Olivia Tennet at New Zealand Film and TV Awards
 2002, ‘Best Performance in a Feature Film - Leading Young Actor’ nomination for Blake Foster at Young Artist Awards
 2002, ‘Best Family Feature Film - Comedy’ nomination at Young Artist Awards

References

External links
 
 
 Kids World  at the New Zealand Film Database

2001 films
New Zealand children's films
American children's films
American adventure films
Films shot in New Zealand
Films set in Oregon
Scanbox Entertainment films
New Zealand adventure films
2000s English-language films
2000s American films